Guanajay is a town and municipality in Artemisa Province in western Cuba, located about  southwest of Havana. The town lies among hills.

Guanajay is the twin town of Axtla De Terrazas

Overview
In colonial times it was an acclimatization station for newly arrived troops from Spain, and subsequently became well known as a health resort. Founded in 1650, it was part of the province of Pinar del Río until 1976. It was then included in La Habana Province until that was divided in two in 2011.

The country surrounding Guanajay is a fertile sugarcane and tobacco region, and historically it has been an important distribution point in the commerce of the western end of the island. Guanajay was an ancient pueblo of considerable size and importance as early as the end of the 18th century.

Demographics
In 2004, the municipality of Guanajay had a population of 28,429.

Gallery

See also
Municipalities of Cuba
List of cities in Cuba
Guanajay Municipal Museum

References

External links

Populated places in Artemisa Province
Populated places established in 1781
1781 establishments in New Spain
1780s establishments in the Spanish West Indies
1780s in Cuba